Harry David Trevaldwyn (14 February 1994) is an English actor, comedian and writer, best known for his roles in The Bubble and Ten Percent, the English remake of Call My Agent!.

Career
Trevaldwyn began his career by posting comedic videos online, portraying an array of different characters.  In March 2022, The Bubble was released to Netflix, in which Trevaldwyn stars as Gunther. In April 2022, Trevaldwyn starred as Ollie Rogers in Ten Percent, the English remake of the French Call My Agent!. The series premiered on Amazon Prime on 28 April 2022. That same month, Channel 4 announced that Trevaldwyn would write and star in Billi. The episode was released on 6 May 2022.

In February 2023, Trevaldwyn was a guest presenter at that year's Casting Director's Guild Casting Awards.

Filmography

References 

Living people
21st-century English actors
1990 births
English film actors
English television actors